Xizi may refer to:

 Khizi District, Azerbaijan
 Khizi, capital of Khizi District
 Alternative name of West Lake, Hangzhou
 Xi Shi, one of the Four Beauties of ancient China
 Misspelling of Xici, part of the ancient divination text I Ching